Keshi Stuart Oluyinka Adetokunboh Anderson (born 6 April 1995) is an English professional footballer who plays as a winger and striker for Blackpool.

After playing youth football with Watford and non-League football with Barton Rovers, Anderson turned professional with Crystal Palace in 2015. He did not make any appearances for the Palace first team, and spent loan spells with Doncaster Rovers, Bolton Wanderers, Northampton Town and Swindon Town. He signed permanently for Swindon in January 2018, leaving the club in June 2020 to sign for Blackpool.

Career
After spending time with the Watford Academy, Anderson began his senior career with Barton Rovers, scoring 32 goals in 53 games in all competitions, including 26 league goals in 41 matches. After scoring a hat-trick in six minutes while on trial at Brentford against Crystal Palace, the latter club signed him in February 2015. He scored on his debut for the Palace under-21 team, and a day later Palace manager Alan Pardew stated that Anderson would be in his senior squad for the forthcoming game away at Leicester City on 7 February.

Anderson joined Doncaster Rovers on a one-month loan on 24 September 2015 and made his Football League debut against Sheffield United a couple of days later. In October, the loan was extended until January 2016. On 21 November, Anderson suffered a broken leg in a match against Rochdale, and returned to Palace.

On 31 August 2016, Anderson moved to EFL League One side Bolton Wanderers on a season-long loan deal. He scored on his Bolton debut three days later as the Wanderers came from behind to draw 1–1 with Southend United at the Macron Stadium. Crystal Palace recalled Anderson on 16 January 2017, and he signed for Northampton Town on loan the next day.

On 31 August 2017, Anderson joined EFL League Two side Swindon Town on loan until January 2018. Two days later, he made his Swindon debut in their 4–1 home defeat against Barnet, featuring for 66 minutes before being replaced by Kaiyne Woolery. On 16 September 2017, Anderson scored his first goal for Swindon during their 3–2 home victory over Stevenage, doubling the hosts' lead in the 13th minute. After the conclusion of his loan period, Anderson joined Swindon on a permanent transfer on 16 January 2018.

A new contract was offered by manager Richie Wellens at the end of Swindon Town's League Two title-winning 2019–20 season; however, Anderson declined the offer and took to social media to announce that he was leaving the club upon the expiration of his contract.

Anderson signed for Blackpool on a two-year contract on 29 June 2020, including an option for the club to extend the deal by a further year. He scored his first goal for the club in an EFL Trophy tie against Accrington Stanley on 6 October 2020.

Personal life
Anderson is eligible to represent either Nigeria or England internationally.

Career statistics

Honours
Swindon Town
EFL League Two: 2019–20

References

1995 births
Living people
Footballers from Luton
English footballers
Association football wingers
Association football forwards
Watford F.C. players
Barton Rovers F.C. players
Crystal Palace F.C. players
Doncaster Rovers F.C. players
Bolton Wanderers F.C. players
Northampton Town F.C. players
Swindon Town F.C. players
Blackpool F.C. players
English Football League players
English people of Nigerian descent